Peter Gruber may refer to:

 Peter Gruber (born 1929), Hungarian-born American philanthropist, co-founder of Peter and Patricia Gruber Foundation
 Peter M. Gruber (1941–2017), Austrian mathematician
 Peter Gruber (footballer) (born 1952), German footballer

See also
 Peter Guber (born 1942), American film studio executive, sports team owner, entrepreneur